The 1938 Copa Aldao was the final match to decide the winner of the Copa Aldao, the 11th. edition of the international competition organised by the Argentine and Uruguayan Associations together. The final was contested by Uruguayan club Peñarol (which played its third consecutive final) and Argentine club Independiente.

The match was played at Estadio Centenario in Montevideo, where Independiente beat Peñarol 3–1, winning its first Copa Aldao Trophy.

Qualified teams

Match details

References

1938 in Argentine football
1938 in Uruguayan football
Peñarol matches
Club Atlético Independiente matches
Football in Montevideo